The Chlorophyceae are a class of green algae, distinguished mainly on the basis of ultrastructural morphology. They are usually green due to the dominance of pigments chlorophyll a and chlorophyll b. The chloroplast may be discoid, plate-like, reticulate, cup-shaped, spiral or ribbon shaped, depending on the species. Most of the members have one or more storage bodies called pyrenoids located in the chloroplast. Pyrenoids contain protein besides starch. Some algae may store food in the form of oil droplets. Green algae usually have a rigid cell wall made up of an inner layer of cellulose and outer layer of pectose.

This list of genera in Chlorophyceae is sub-divided by order and family. Some genera have uncertain taxonomic placement and are listed as incertae sedis. The list is based on the data available in AlgaeBase, the Integrated Taxonomic Information System (ITIS) and other taxonomic databases.

Order Chaetopeltidales 

 Family Chaetopeltidaceae
 Chaetopeltis
 Floydiella
 Hormotilopsis
 Planophila
 Pseudulvella
 Family Dicranochaetaceae
 Dicranochaete

Order Chaetophorales 

 Family Aphanochaetaceae
Aphanochaete
Chaetonema
Gonatoblaste
Micropoa
Thamniochaete
 Family Barrancaceae
 Barranca
 Family Chaetophoraceae
 Arthrochaete
 Caespitella
 Cedercreutziella
 Chaetomnion
 Chaetonemopsis
 Chaetophora
 Chloroclonium
 Chlorofilum
 Chlorotylium
 Choreoclonium
 Cloniophora
 Coccobotrys
 Crenacantha
 Diaphragma
 Didymosporangium
 Draparnaldia
 Draparnaldioides
 Draparnaldiopsis
 Elaterodiscus
 Endoclonium
 Endophyton
 Entodictyon
 Epibolium
 Fritschiella
 Gloeoplax
 Gongrosira
 Gongrosirella
 Herposteiron
 Hormotila
 Ireksokonia
 Iwanoffia
 Jaagiella
 Klebahniella
 Kymatotrichon
 Leptosiropsis
 Lochmiopsis
 Myxonemopsis
 Nayalia
 Periplegmatium
 Pilinella
 Pleurangium
 Pleurococcus
 Protoderma
 Pseudochaete
 Skvortzoviothrix
 Sporocladopsis
 Stereococcus
 Stigeoclonium
 Streptochlora
 Thamniochloris
 Thamniolum
 Trichodiscus
 Tumulofilum
 Uvulifera
 Zoddaea
 Zygomitus
 Family Schizomeridaceae
 Schizomeris
 Family Uronemataceae
 Uronema
Incertae sedis
Gloeococcus

Order Chlamydomonadales 

 Family Asteromonadaceae
 Asteromonas
 Family Characiochloridaceae
 Characiochloris
 Chlamydopodium
 Family Characiosiphonaceae
 Characiosiphon
 Lobocharacium
 Family Chlamydomonadaceae
 Brachiomonas
 Carteria
 Chlainomonas
 Chlamydomonas
 Chloromonas
 Halosarcinochlamys
 Heterochlamydomonas
 Lobochlamys
 Lobomonas
 Oogamochlamys
 Polytoma
 Pseudocarteria
 Vitreochlamys
 Family Chlorochytriaceae
 Burkillia
 Chlorochytrium
 Phyllobium
 Rhodochytrium
 Family Dunaliellaceae
 Dunaliella
 Hafniomonas
 Polytomella
 Spermatozopsis
 Family Goniaceae
 Astrephomene
 Gonium
 Family Haematococcaceae
 Chlorogonium
 Haematococcus
 Stephanosphaera
 Family Palmellopsidaceae
 Asterococcus
 Family Phacotaceae
 Dysmorphococcus
 Phacotus
 Pteromonas
 Wislouchiella
 Family Sphaerodictyaceae
 Pectodictyon
 Family Spondylomoraceae
 Pyrobotrys
 Family Tetrabaenaceae
 Eudorina
 Tetrabaena
 Family Volvocaceae
 Basichlamys
 Hemiflagellochloris
 Pandorina
 Platydorina
 Platymonas
 Pleodorina
 Volvox
 Volvulina
 Yamagishiella
 Incertae sedis
 Coleochlamys
 Golenkinia
 Lobosphaeropsis
 Pseudochlorothecium

Order Chlorococcales 

 Family Actinochloridaceae
 Deasonia
 Family Chlorococcaceae
 Apodochloris
 Bracteacoccus
 Chlorococcopsis
 Chlorococcum
 Chlorohippotes
 Chlorotetraedron
 Closteridium
 Cystomonas
 Desmatractum
 Emergococcus
 Emergosphaera
 Ettlia
 Fasciculochloris
 Ferricystis
 Follicularia
 Heterotetracystis
 Hydrianum
 Korshikoviella
 Neochloris
 Neospongiococcum
 Octogoniella
 Oophila
 Phaseolaria
 Poloidion
 Pseudodictyochloris
 Pseudoplanophila
 Pseudospongiococcum
 Pseudotetracystis
 Pseudotrochiscia
 Schroederia
 Skujaster
 Spongiochloris
 Tetracystis
 Trochisciopsis
 Valkanoviella
 Family Coccomyxaceae
 Choricystis
 Coccomyxa
 Dactylothece
 Diogenes
 Dispora
 Lusitania
 Ourococcus
 Palmogloea
 Paradoxia
 Family Endosphaeraceae
 Burkillia
 Endosphaera
 Phyllobium
 Rhodochytrium
 Family Hormotilaceae
 Dendrocystis
 Heleococcus
 Hormotila
 Palmodactylon
 Palmodictyon
 Planochloris
 Family Hypnomonadaceae
 Actinochloris
 Hypnomonas
 Kremastochloris
 Sphaerellocystis
 Family Micractiniaceae
 Acanthosphaera
 Echinosphaeridium
 Golenkiniopsis
 Micractinium
 Family Sorastraceae
 Sorastrum
 Incertae sedis
 Protosiphon
 Pseudodictyosphaerium

Order Chlorosarcinales 
 Incertae sedis
 Chlorosarcina
 Chlorosarcinopsis
 Chlorosphaeropsis
 Desmochloris
 Neochlorosarcina

Order Oedogoniales 
 Family Oedogoniaceae
 Oedocladium
 Oedogonium

Order Sphaeropleales 

 Family Characiaceae
 Actidesmium
 Ankyra
 Characiella
 Characiellopsis
 Characium
 Deuterocharacium
 Lanceola
 Marthea
 Pseudoschroederia
 Family Cylindrocapsaceae 
 Cylindrocapsa
 Cylindrocapsopsis
 Fusola
 Family Dictyochloridaceae
 Dictyochloris
 Family Dictyosphaeriaceae
 Botryococcus
 Dactylosphaerium
 Dictyosphaerium
 Dimorphococcopsis
 Gilbertsmithia
 Tetracoccus
 Westella
 Family Hydrodictyaceae
 Euastropsis
 Helierella
 Hydrodictyon
 Lacunastrum
 Monactinus
 Parapediastrum
 Pediastrum
 Pseudopediastrum
 Sorastrum
 Sphaerastrum
 Stauridium
 Tetraedroides
 Tetraedron
 Tetrapedia
 Family Microsporaceae
 Microspora
 Family Neochloridaceae
 Ascochloris
 Botryosphaerella
 Chlorotetraedron
 Echinosphaeridium
 Neochloris
 Poloidion
 Family Radiococcaceae
 Catenococcus
 Coenobotrys
 Coenochloris
 Coenococcus
 Coenocystis
 Coenodispora
 Crucigloea
 Eutetramorus
 Garhundacystis
 Gloeocystis
 Hindakochloris
 Korshikoviobispora
 Neocystis
 Palmellosphaerium
 Palmococcus
 Palmodictyon
 Radiococcus
 Schizochloris
 Sphaerochloris
 Sphaerococcomyxa
 Sphaeroneocystis
 Sporotetras
 Thorakochloris
 Tomaculum
 Family Scenedesmaceae
 Acutodesmus
 Asterarcys
 Astrocladium
 Chodatodesmus
 Closteriococcus
 Coelastrella
 Coelastropsis
 Coelastrum
 Comasiella
 Crucigeniopsis
 Danubia
 Desmodesmus
 Dimorphococcus
 Enallax
 Flechtneria
 Gilbertsmithia
 Hariotina
 Hofmania
 Hylodesmus
 Komarekia
 Lauterborniella
 Neodesmus
 Pectinodesmus
 Pseudodidymocystis
 Pseudotetrastrum
 Scenedesmus
 Schistochilium
 Schmidledesmus
 Schroederiella
 Scotiellopsis
 Soropediastrum
 Staurogenia
 Steinedesmus
 Tetradesmus
 Tetrallantos
 Tetranephris
 Tetrastrum
 Truncatulus
 Verrucodesmus
 Westella
 Westellopsis
 Willea
 Yadavaea
 Family Selenastraceae
 Ankistrodesmus
 Chlorolobion
 Curvastrum
 Drepanochloris
 Gregiochloris
 Kirchneriella
 Messastrum
 Monoraphidium
 Planktococcomyxa
 Podohedriella
 Pseudokirchneriella
 Pseudoquadrigula
 Quadrigula
 Raphidocelis
 Selenastrum
 Family Sphaeropleaceae
 Atractomorpha
 Characiopodium
 Parallela
 Radiofilum
 Sphaeroplea
 Family Treubariaceae
 Treubaria
Incertae sedis
Polyedriopsis

Order Tetrasporales 

 Family Chlorangiellaceae
 Cecidochloris
 Chlamydomonadopsis
 Chlorangiopsis
 Metapolytoma
 Physocytium
 Stylosphaeridiella
 Family Gloeocystaceae
 Asterococcus
 Chlamydocapsa
 Gloeococcus
 Gloeocystis
 Tetrasporidium
 Family Palmellaceae
 Askenasyella
 Chalarodora
 Chloranomala
 Gloiodictyon
 Györffyana
 Hormotilopsis
 Oncosaccus
 Palmella
 Palmellopsis
 Palmoclathrus
 Planctococcus
 Sphaerocystis
 Family Palmellopsidaceae
 Nautocapsa
 Palmophyllum
 Ploeotila
 Pseudotetraspora
 Verdigellas
 Family Tetrasporaceae
 Apiocystis
 Gloeodendron
 Octosporiella
 Paulschulzia
 Placosphaera
 Schizochlamys
 Tetraspora

Incertae sedis 

 Alvikia 
 Bicuspidella
 Elakatothrix
 Mychonastes
 Planktosphaeria
 Pleurastrum
 Pseudomuriella

References 
 
 

 
Chlorophyceae genera
Chlorophyceae
Chlorophyceae